Route 114 is a highway in southeastern Missouri.  Its eastern terminus is at Business U.S. Route 60 west of Sikeston; its western terminus is at Route 25 in Dexter.

Major intersections

References

114
Transportation in Stoddard County, Missouri
Transportation in New Madrid County, Missouri
Transportation in Scott County, Missouri